The International School Ibadan (ISI) is located on the Campus of the University of Ibadan, Nigeria's oldest university.

History
The school was founded by German-British educator Kurt Hahn on 13 October 1963 with funding received from the USAID, Ford Foundation and donation of land by the then Nigerian Western Regional government. Most of the pioneer teaching staff were British expatriate educators from Gordonstoun in Scotland. The school is a co-educational Boarding and Day School admitting pupils aged 10 to 16. It was primarily established to meet world-class educational standards for children of expatriates, living and working in Nigeria. It opened its doors to pupils of both expatriates of diverse nationalities and highly placed Nigerians. The first Principal was David S. Snell (1963–1965) of blessed memory; followed by John Gillespie(1965–1968). The longest serving Principal was an Anglican clergy, Archdeacon J.A. Iluyomade (1969–1985) of blessed memory.
He was also the first indigenous head of the school. After him was Rev. (Dr.) Dapo Ajayi (1986–1988) also of blessed memory, then Dapo Fajembola (1990 –1991) also of blessed memory. Thereafter came the first female Principal, Esther Adetola Smith (1991–2004). After her was R.O. Akintilebo (2006–2007) also of blessed memory, Dr. M.B Malik (2007– 2017), Phebean O. Olowe (2017 – 2022), Akintunde Yinka (2022 – present)

ISI is well known for socials, extra-curricular activities like the international soiree (an event which comes up once every two years). The International soiree is an evening where all the nationalities represented among staff and students display the food, clothing and other material aspects of culture for sale with the objective of raising money for the less privileged. The Charity walk is another event that students use to raise money for the less privileged. 
Service to mankind is embedded in the culture of ISI. 

Academically, it originally followed the British system of five years to preparation for Ordinary Level (General Certificate of Education) and West African School Certificate Examinations; with another two years in the sixth form to prepare for Advanced level (General Certificate of Education) and Higher School Certificate examinations. As a result of the introduction of the 6-3-3-4 Nigerian educational system introduced in the late eighties, it runs the mandatory six years of secondary school education, in addition to preparing students for international exams like the annual IGCSE 'O' Levels and Cambridge 'A' level exams. For many years, it has offered preparation for the International Baccalaureate.
Although it now follows the 6-3-3-4 system of Nigerian education, many of the students continue to prepare for international examinations. The then Principal, Dr. M.B. Malik, worked assiduously towards the resuscitation of the Cambridge 'A' Level programme in September 2011 and the programme is waxing stronger and stronger till this day.

The School celebrated its golden jubilee in October 2013.

Alumni
ISI has produced notable alumni including 

 Bamidele Abiodun, (First Lady of Ogun State)
 Oluwatoyin Asojo (American scientist)
 Bolanle Austen-Peters (Nigerian businesswoman)
 Femi Emiola (American actress)
 Akin Fayomi, (Nigerian diplomat)
 Toby Foyeh (British musician)
 Efa Iwara, (Nigerian actor)
 Bill Ivy (Canadian Veteran Photographer and Author)
 Funmi Iyanda (Nigerian television personality)
 Omobola Johnson (Nigerian former Communications Minister)
 Karen King-Aribisala, (Novelist and Associate Professor of English at University of Lagos)
 Tolu Ogunlesi, (Nigerian journalist)
 Alex Oke, (Nigerian chef)
 Ngozi Okonjo-Iweala (Director General of the World Trade Organization and former Nigerian Finance Minister)
 Ifedayo Olarinde (Freeze of Cool FM, multi-award winning OAP)
 Yewande Olubummo, (American Mathematics Professor)
 Olayinka Omigbodun (Nigerian physician and academic)
 Dolapo Osinbajo (Second Lady of Nigeria)
 Adepoju Oyemade (Senior Pastor, The Covenant Nation)
 Sasha P; (Nigerian rapper and Olympic torch bearer)
 Helen Prest-Ajayi (Miss Nigeria 1979)
 Joshua Uzoigwe (Nigerian musicologist)

See also
Kenneth Dike
Samuel Tunde Bajah

References

External links
Official website

Educational institutions established in 1963
Secondary schools in Oyo State
Cambridge schools in Nigeria
University of Ibadan
1963 establishments in Nigeria
Co-educational boarding schools
International high schools
International schools in Ibadan
British international schools in Nigeria
Boarding schools in Nigeria